Antoniya is a Russian and Bulgarian feminine given name that is derived from Antonius and is a variant of Antonina in use in Israel, Vietnam, Moldova, Bulgaria, Romania, Hungary, Slovakia, Czech Republic, Poland, Ukraine, Belarus, Lithuania, Latvia, Estonia, Georgia, Azerbaijan, Armenia, Russia, Mongolia, Kazakhstan, Kyrgyzstan, Uzbekistan, Turkmenistan, and Tajikistan. Notable people with this name include the following.

Antoniya Grigorova (born 1986), Bulgarian cross-country skier
Antoniya Yordanova (born 1976), Bulgarian long jumper

See also

Antonia (name)
Antonida Asonova
Antonija
Antonina (name) 
Antoñita (disambiguation)
Antonya Nelson

Notes

Bulgarian feminine given names
Russian feminine given names